Alban Bushi (born 20 August 1973) is an Albanian professional football coach and former player who is the current manager of Albania under-21 and under-20 team. He is nicknamed "Loku".

During his playing career he played as a striker. Bushi during his 19-year career has played with 12 different clubs in 6 different countries. He started his career with capital club Tirana where he had an impressive goal-per-game ratio; he also had three short spells on loan with Szegedi in Hungary, FC Remscheid in Germany and Flamurtari Vlorë in Albania. He then went off to Greece to play for a short time at Apollon Smyrni. Following that he enjoyed a decent time at Litex Lovech before spending the next four years in Turkey by representing Adanaspor, İstanbulspor, and Trabzonspor.

Bushi returned to Albania in summer of 2004 to play for one season with Partizani Tirana before returning to Greece, where he would spend the next five years at Levadiakos. At the end of his career, Bushi returned to Albania once again to represent Tirana, stating that it was a "moral debt" to end his career where it started. He retired from football in November 2010.

Bushi also had a successful international career, being part of Albania national team for 12 years. With 14 goals, he was Albania's all-time leading top scorer from 2004 until Erjon Bogdani overtook him in 2011. He retired from international football in 2007.

Club career
Bushi enjoyed a long playing career which has seen him play for 12 different clubs in six different countries. He started off his career in Albania with Tirana. He made his professional debut for Tirana in the 1992–93 season and after spending two seasons with the club, he then moved to Hungary with Szegedi. Soon after he was transferred in Germany to FC Remscheid. After two years abroad, he made a return to Albania, playing for two years between Tirana and Flamurtari Vlorë. He then moved to Greece signing for Apollon Smyrni and right after a half season, he headed off to Bulgaria to join Litex Lovech, where he became the first foreigner to captain the team. He spent two seasons in the Bulgarian A Football Group, winning them both.

After his spell in Bulgaria he moved to Turkey to play initially for Adanaspor in the 1999–2000 1.Lig. Then he signed for fellow 1.Lig side Istanbulspor. In his first season 2000–01 he scored 12 goals in 29 matches as İstanbulspor finished 12th. In the next season 2001–02 he played 16 games in where he scored four goals in the first-half before moving on loan to another Süper Lig team Trabzonspor with whom he played only five matches but unable to score. He was part of Trabzonspor for another half season in 2002–03 playing seven matches failing once again to score, before returning to Istanbulspor for the second half in which he played 14 matches managing 4 goals to contribute in team's 9th place. In the 2003–04 season Bushi played 21 games and scored 5 goals to help Istanbulspor avoid relegation with one point above 16th place Bursaspor. He was part of the team in the first half of the 2004–05 Süper Lig playing 16 matches scoring once before returning to Albania after many years playing abroad and signed with Partizani Tirana for the second half of the 2004–05 Albanian Superliga; he played 14 games and netted 5 goals. He then went off to Greece again to join AE Levadiakos. In his first season 2005–06 Alpha Ethniki he played 22 matches often as a starter in which he scored 8 goals as Levadiakos however was relegated to Beta Ethniki. After that he moved on loan at Apollon Kalamarias playing in two seasons in the Superleague Greece, 2006–07 and 2007–08. Then, he went back to AE Levadiakos.

Bushi was returned after 13 years to Tirana, the club where his career began, signing on 31 August 2010. He was presented to the media alongside fellow veteran Devi Muka. Although having offers from foreign teams, he felt that he had the moral debt to Tirana to end his career where he started it, a decision that earned Bushi the Swan d'Or from the Albanian Football Association in recognition of his service to Albanian football.

His first game in Albania after over 13 years came on 3 October 2010 in an away game against Skënderbeu Korçë, where he came on as a substitute for Pero Pejic in the 65th minute in a game which ended in a 2–1 loss for Bushi's side. He played his first match as a starter on 31 October against Teuta Durrës, contributing in a 2–0 home win. He finished his final spell with Tirana by playing five league matches, three of them as a starter, failing to score.

On 23 November, he officially announced his retirement from football at the age of 37.

International career

Youth
Bushi was part of the Albania U21 national team during the 1994 UEFA European Under-21 Championship qualification playing two games both against Germany U21 on 17 November and 22 December 1992.

Senior
Bushi is a former Albania's all-time top scorer with 14 goals until Erjon Bogdani with his goal against France in 2011 became the new record holder with 15. He made 67 appearances Albania, the tenth highest in the team's history.

Bushi scored on his international debut for Albania on 16 August 1995 against Malta at Ta' Qali National Stadium, netting the temporary equalizer in the 72nd minute in an eventual 2–1 loss. He made his competitive debut on 15 November in the match against Wales for the qualifiers of the UEFA Euro 1996, entering as a second-half substitute in a 1–1 home draw.

Managerial career
On 17 January 2012, Bushi was named as the Albania national team manager, a role which the Albanian Football Association applied for the first time following suggestion of new arrived coach at Albania Gianni De Biasi.

Bushi was named Albania under-16 coach for their participation in the UEFA Development Tournament 2015 in May 2015. He won the tournament by winning all three matches.

Following naming of Paolo Tramezzani as national team director, on 9 December 2016 Bushi was named as the Albania under-21 manager. He won his first game with Albania U21 on 27 March 2017 against Moldova 2–0. In collaboration with the Albanian Football Association, reborned the under-20 side by assigning a friendly versus Georgia on 14 November 2017 at David Petriashvili Stadium, Tbilisi, with Bushi as the coach at the same time along the under-21 national team.

Career statistics

Club

International

Managerial

Honours

Player
Tirana
 Albanian Superliga: 1996–97

Litex Lovech
 Bulgarian A Football Group: 1997–98, 1998–99

Manager
Albania U16
UEFA Development Tournament: 2015

References

External links
 
 

1973 births
Living people
Footballers from Tirana
Albanian footballers
Association football forwards
Kategoria Superiore players
Super League Greece players
First Professional Football League (Bulgaria) players
Süper Lig players
KF Tirana players
Szeged LC footballers
VfB Remscheid players
Flamurtari Vlorë players
Apollon Smyrnis F.C. players
PFC Litex Lovech players
Adanaspor footballers
İstanbulspor footballers
Trabzonspor footballers
FK Partizani Tirana players
Levadiakos F.C. players
Apollon Pontou FC players
Albania youth international footballers
Albania under-21 international footballers
Albania international footballers
Albania national under-21 football team managers
Albanian expatriate footballers
Albanian expatriate sportspeople in Hungary
Albanian expatriate sportspeople in Germany
Albanian expatriate sportspeople in Greece
Albanian expatriate sportspeople in Bulgaria
Albanian expatriate sportspeople in Turkey
Expatriate footballers in Hungary
Expatriate footballers in Germany
Expatriate footballers in Greece
Expatriate footballers in Bulgaria
Expatriate footballers in Turkey
Albanian football managers